Colombey may refer to:

 Colombey-les-Belles, Meurthe-et-Moselle, France
 Colombey-les-Deux-Églises, Haute-Marne, France, home of Charles de Gaulle

See also
 Collombey-Muraz, a municipality in Valais, Switzerland
 Battle of Borny–Colombey, 1870 near Metz, part of the Franco–Prussian War